Alfonso Martín Castillo (born 10 June 1994), sometimes known as Alfonsito, is a Spanish footballer who plays for CD Atlético Baleares on loan from AD Alcorcón as a midfielder.

Club career
Born in Jerez de la Frontera, Cádiz, Martín graduated from Xerez CD's youth system, and made his senior debut with the reserves on 7 January 2013, against GE Bazán CF.

On 3 May 2013, Martín made his debut for the first team, in a 1–3 home defeat against Córdoba CF in the Segunda División championship. In August he moved to the latter, being assigned to the B-side in Segunda División B.

In January 2014, after being rarely used, Martín moved to Écija Balompié also in the third division. On 21 August, he joined Tercera División side CD Guadalcacín.

On 11 July 2016, Martín returned to the third level after agreeing to a contract with Real Balompédica Linense. Roughly one year later he signed for another reserve team, CD Vitoria in the same division.

On 2 August 2018, Martín signed for UD Melilla still in the third tier. The following 12 July, he agreed to a three-year contract with AD Alcorcón in the second division, but was immediately loaned to Cultural y Deportiva Leonesa for one year.

On 25 August 2020, Martín was loaned to fellow third division side CD Atlético Baleares for the 2020–21 campaign.

References

External links

1994 births
Living people
Footballers from Jerez de la Frontera
Spanish footballers
Association football midfielders
Segunda División players
Segunda División B players
Xerez CD B players
Xerez CD footballers
Córdoba CF B players
Écija Balompié players
Real Balompédica Linense footballers
CD Vitoria footballers
UD Melilla footballers
AD Alcorcón footballers
Cultural Leonesa footballers
CD Atlético Baleares footballers